The members of the House of Representatives of the Netherlands for GreenLeft, 1989–present is a list of all members of the House of Representatives who have been members of the GreenLeft faction since the party's inception in 1989. 
GreenLeft is a Dutch green political party. It was formed in 1989 as a merger of four parties: the left-socialist Pacifist Socialist Party, the communist Communist Party of the Netherlands, the progressive Christian Political Party of Radicals, and the progressive Christian Evangelical People's Party

House
GreenLeft